The Kick is a 2011 Thai martial arts film, directed by Prachya Pinkaew. The film follows a Korean family of taekwondo experts who immigrate to Thailand.

Plot
Mun is a taekwondo master running an old taekwondo gym in Bangkok. All five members of his family are also taekwondo exponents, each of whom infuses the art with a particular skill: his wife Mija in cooking style, son Taeyang in dancing style, daughter Taemi in soccer style, and the youngest, Typhoon, can break anything with his strong forehead.

Mun wants his children to become taekwondo coaches and take over his gym in the future. However, Taeyang wants to be a famous pop singer and Taemi is only interested in her secret crush at school.

One day, Taeyang foils a gang's attempt to steal a priceless antique kris. Pom, the leader of the gang, is the only one to escape and threatens revenge. Mun's family becomes more popular in the public eye, but they do not know when or where Pom will try to get his revenge.

Cast
Cho Jae-hyun as Master Mun
Ye Ji-won as Yun Mija 
Na Tae-joo as Taeyang
Kim Gyeongsuk as Taemi
Do Shigang as Beom
Lee Hundon as Seokdu
Kim Yiroo as Yiroo
Yanin Vismitananda as Wawa
Petchtai Wongkamlao as Uncle Mam

References

External links
 

2010s Korean-language films
Thai-language films
Thai martial arts films
Taekwondo films
Sahamongkol Film International films
Muay Thai films
Thai Muay Thai films
2011 action films
2011 films
2011 multilingual films
Films directed by Prachya Pinkaew
South Korean multilingual films
South Korean martial arts films
2011 martial arts films
Thai multilingual films
2010s South Korean films